Tempography is a conceptual video art project founded at the end of 2003 in London by Swiss artist Anthony Bannwart and Swedish artist Magnus Aronson. It is a minimalist form of silent moving image.

Description
To qualify as a 'Tempograph' the image should be a relatively static shot with a repetitive action occurring within the confines of the screen. The shot should last no longer than 30 seconds. The images must not be edited, digitally enhanced, or have the chronology altered in any way.

The founders of the project claim reference to Russian filmmaker Dziga Vertov. Tempographs have been described as "brief visual impacts creating an atmosphere, an image of thought, rather than telling a story."

Exhibitions
Bannwart and Aronson built the Tempotheque, a display of the collection. Rather than being given names, codes are assigned to the Tempographs, such as T3.HON.02.26, that reveal the author (HON=Anthony Bannwart), time of capture (02), and duration of the shot in seconds (26).

In 2004 tempographs were displayed on multiple screens on more than 200 double-decker buses in London and in Birmingham.

In 2006 a tempographic community art project was exhibited in Stockholm by the cultural institution ZITA and by the Kleerup Gallery. In 2008 the project was hosted by the Gallery Factory in Seoul, Republic of Korea, accompanied by a symposium/workshop. This led to further public screenings in Seoul.

References

European artist groups and collectives
Video art